Hamza Khabba (Arabic:  حمزة خابا; born June 9, 1996) is a Moroccan professional footballer who plays as a forward for Raja CA, on loan from Al-Arabi SC of Kuwait Premier League.

References

1996 births
Living people
Moroccan footballers
Raja CA players
Olympic Club de Safi players
AS FAR (football) players
People from Mohammedia
Association football forwards